The Roaches (from the French les roches - the rocks) is a prominent rocky ridge above Leek and Tittesworth Reservoir in the Staffordshire Peak District of England.

Along with Ramshaw Rocks and Hen Cloud, from Old English Henge Clud, meaning "steep rock", they form a gritstone escarpment, which is popular with hikers, rock climbers and freerunners. It is often very busy especially at weekends.

The Roaches Estate was purchased by the Peak District National Park Authority in the 1980s to safeguard the area from adverse development. From May 2013 Staffordshire Wildlife Trust took on the management of the Roaches Estate.

In clear conditions, it is possible to see much of Cheshire and views stretching as far as Snowdon in Wales and Winter Hill in Lancashire.

The Roaches are the most prominent part of a curving ridge which extends for several miles from Hen Cloud in the south to Back Forest and Hangingstone in the northwest. At the top there is a small pool called Doxey Pool that is, according to legend, inhabited by a water spirit. Nearby are the broad hills of Gun and Morridge.

Geology 

The Roaches, Hen Cloud and Ramshaw Rocks are formed from a thick bed of coarse sandstone ('gritstone') of Namurian age, a subdivision of the NW European Carboniferous system from ca 315 to 326.4 Ma, which occurs widely across the Peak District and takes its name, the Roaches Grit, from this location. The nearby Five Clouds are formed from a thinner bed of similar sandstone known as the Five Clouds Sandstone. These sandstones originated as delta sands dropped by major rivers draining a mountainous landmass to the north. The sandstone beds of both The Roaches and Hen Cloud dip moderately steeply to the east into the north–south-aligned syncline known as the Goyt Trough. The same beds at Ramshaw Rocks dip steeply to the northwest into the syncline. The southern end of the Roaches is defined by the presence of an east–west fault that runs through the col separating the Roaches from Hen Cloud.

Wildlife
In the 1930s five Australian Bennett's wallabies were released into the wild from a private collection. The colony survived into the 21st century but may now be extinct.

In 2008, a pair of peregrine falcons successfully bred on the Roaches, causing climbing on part of the rock face to be suspended for a period. Since then, the resident pair of peregrine falcons has had further successful hatchings, although there have also been cases of theft of eggs and young birds at the site.

Doxey Pool

Legend has it that this pool is inhabited by a mermaid called Jenny Greenteeth known as the blue nymph. The legend says that she fell in the pool on a foggy day whilst walking along the top of the Roaches, and ever since has been enticing unsuspecting victims down to the pool and to their watery grave.

The Winking Man

The Winking Man Rock formation (also known as the Winking Eye) is part of the Ramshaw Rocks section of The Roaches. It can be seen from the Leek–Buxton road (A53) about 5 miles outside Leek. It looks like a face sticking out of the hillside, and as you travel past in a car towards Buxton the 'eye' appears to wink, as a pinnacle of rock passes behind the face as a consequence of parallax.

Don Whillans Memorial Hut

The Roaches is the site of the Don Whillans Memorial Hut, also known as the Rockhall Cottage.

References

External links 
 The Roaches website
 A page partly about the Roaches – from a website about the town of Leek, Staffordshire and the Staffordshire Moorlands
 Another page about the Roaches – from a different website about the Peak District
 Computer-generated summit panorama

Hills of Staffordshire
Mountains and hills of the Peak District
Staffordshire Moorlands
Leek, Staffordshire
Climbing areas of England